Hog-nosed rattler may refer to:

 Sistrurus miliarius barbouri, a.k.a. the dusky pigmy rattlesnake, a venomous pitviper subspecies found in the southeastern United States
 Heterodon platirhinos, a.k.a. the eastern hog-nosed snake, harmless colubrid species found in North America

Animal common name disambiguation pages